The 2022–23 Independence Cup, also known as Bashundhara Group Independence Cup 2022 due to the sponsorship from Bashundhara Group. It was the 12th edition of the Independence Cup, the oldest official  club football tournament in Bangladesh. A total of 16 teams were contested in the tournament including two coming through qualifying round.

Bashundhara Kings is the defending champion. They have won the title by beating Sheikh Russel KC by 2(4)−2(1) penalties shoot out on 5 December 2022.

Participating teams
The following sixteen teams will contest in the tournament.

Venues
The matches are being played at these three venues across the country.

Draw
The draw ceremony were held on 31 October 2022 at 3rd floor of BFF house Motijheel, Dhaka. There are sixteen team was divided into four groups. Top two team from each group will through in the Knockout stage.

Group summary

Round and dates

Match officials
Referees

 Md Anisur Rahman  Sagor
 Anwar Hossain 
 Bituraj Barua
 Md Mizanur Rahman
 Md Nasiruddin
 Golam Mourshed Chowdhury Nayan
 Bhubon Mohon Tarafder
 Sabuj Das
 Rimon Mahmud

Assistant Referees

 Md Nuruzzaman
 Md Jahid Hasan 
 Sheikh Iqbal Alam
 Md Alamgir Sarker
 Rasel Mahmud 
 Md Monir Dhali
 Md Mahmudul Hasan Mamun
 Sujoy Barua
 Junayed Sharif
 Ahmed Rafsan Joni
 Robin Khan
 Mehedi Hasan Emon
 Shah Alam
 Shafiqul Islam Emon 
 Soumik Pal
 Bikash Sarker

Qualifying play-offs

Matches
All times at local (UTC+6)

Group stages

Tiebreakers
Teams were ranked according to points (3 points for a win, 1 point for a draw, 0 points for a loss), and if tied on points, the following tie-breaking criteria were applied, in the order given, to determine the rankings.
Points in head-to-head matches among tied teams;
Goal difference in head-to-head matches among tied teams;
Goals scored in head-to-head matches among tied teams;
If more than two teams are tied, and after applying all head-to-head criteria above, a subset of teams are still tied, all head-to-head criteria above are reapplied exclusively to this subset of teams;
Goal difference in all group matches;
Goals scored in all group matches;
Penalty shoot-out if only two teams were tied and they met in the last round of the group;
Disciplinary points (yellow card = 1 point, red card as a result of two yellow cards = 3 points, direct red card = 3 points, yellow card followed by direct red card = 4 points);
Drawing of lots.

Group A

Group B

</onlyinclude>

Group C

</onlyinclude>

Group D

</onlyinclude>

Knockout stage
In the knockout stages, if a match finished goalless at the end of normal playing time, extra time would have been played (two periods of 15 minutes each) and followed, if necessary, by a penalty shoot-out to determine the winner.

Bracket

Quarter-finals

Semi-finals

Third-place

Final

Statistics

Goalscorers

Own goals 
† Bold Club indicates winner of the match

Hat-tricks 

n  Player scored n goals.

Winners

Awards

Player of the Match

See also

 2022–23 Federation Cup (Bangladesh)
 2022–23 Bangladesh Premier League

References

Independence Cup (Bangladesh)
2022 in Bangladeshi football
2022 Asian domestic association football cups